Solute carrier family 22 member 15 is a protein that in humans is encoded by the SLC22A15 gene.

Function

Organic ion transporters, such as SLC22A15, transport various medically and physiologically important compounds, including pharmaceuticals, toxins, hormones, neurotransmitters, and cellular metabolites. These transporters are also referred to as amphiphilic solute facilitators (ASFs).

References

Further reading 

Human proteins